Ranjish Hi Sahi is a Pakistani family drama series, produced by Asif Raza Mir and Babar Javed under their production banner A&B Entertainment. The drama aired weekly on Geo Entertainment every Tuesday from 29, October 2013 until 22 April 2014. It stars Samiya Mumtaz, Faisal Rehman, Sana Javed and Maya Ali in lead roles. 
 The Show is also aired on indian channel Colors Rishtey

Cast

Faisal Rehman as Kamaal Hassan
Samiya Mumtaz as Yumna
Sana Javed as Tooba
Maya Ali as Hiba
Saba Hameed as Bilquees
Emmad Irfani as Rohail
Humaira Ali as Hira
Noor Hassan
Muhammad Ali

References

Pakistani television series
Geo TV original programming
2013 Pakistani television series debuts
2014 Pakistani television series endings